CPH PIX is the result of the merging of the Copenhagen International Film Festival and the NatFilm Festival in 2008, which created the organisation Copenhagen Film Festivals. Copenhagen Film Festivals also manages the documentary festival CPH:DOX. The festival was founded by Jacob Neiiendam who administered the festival until the end of its 10th edition in 2018.

The first edition of CPH PIX was held in April 2009 with an audience of 36,500 - the largest crowd ever recorded for a film festival in Copenhagen at the time. Since its first edition the festival has grown in size to a total of 78,000 audiences in 2017. 

In 2016 the festival merged with BUSTER Film Festival for Children and Youth, whereas the festival period also moved from April to October/November.

Until 2018 the festival lasted for two weeks with a packed program of more than 200 films from around the world, as well as 700 film related events and activities. 

The festival has hosted seminars, educational workshops, artist talks, theatrical performances and film related concerts. Throughout the years well known artists such as John Carpenter, Godspeed You! Black Emperor, Jean-Michel Jarre, Tangerine Dream and Jóhann Jóhannsson have performed as part of the festival.

In 2018, the successful head of the documentary film festival CPH:DOX, Tine Fischer, was put in charge of CPH PIX. During her management the festival’s format relaunched in a new compressed WEEKEND edition.

The first WEEKEND edition was held in 2019 with a strongly curated program consisting of 20 films in 4 days. With the new compressed edition of CPH PIX, the festival once again separated from BUSTER Film Festival for Children and Youth. In 2020, CPH PIX was canceled due to the COVID-19 pandemic.

In 2021, CPH PIX returned with an expanded WEEKEND program consisting of 40 films spanning 5 days. The festival was held from 10-14 November with film screenings in both Copenhagen and Aarhus. At the festival, there were also visits from a number of leading film directors, including Mia Hansen-Løve and Eskil Vogt.

Festival programme 
The following film sections are recurring in the program curated by the festival's program committee.

 The Crystal Ball: The WEEKEND’s international competition for feature film debutants. The winner of the Crystal Ball will be announced during the festival and will be awarded 5000 Euros. 
The Human Touch: Selection of films that explore social relationships and human emotional life with striking clarity. Dedicated to those filmmakers who, with a simple aesthetic, appeal to our emotions and thoughts.
The Wild Side: Selection of films that challenge and expand the boundaries and possibilities of the medium. The selection explores both alternative environments and characters, as well as untamed experimental aesthetics.

Awards 
Throughout time CPH PIX has awarded four different prizes;

 New Talent Grand PIX has been the main award given to a debuting director. The winner has been selected by an international jury of industry professionals.
Politiken Talent Award has been given to a debuting director of a Danish feature film in collaboration with Politiken.
PIX Audience Award has been selected by audiences who has voted for their favorite among the nominated films.
BUSTER's Best Children’s Film has been selected by a special children's jury. This award has been handed out since 2016 as part of BUSTER - the festival's program for kids, schools and families.
The festival currently awards one prize:

 The Crystal Ball is the WEEKEND’s international competition for feature film debutants. The winner of the Crystal Ball is selected by a jury consisting of industry professionals.

The previous winners of these awards are:

2009

2010

2011

2012

2013

2014

2015

2016

2017

2018

2019

2020 
Canceled due to the COVID-19 pandemic

2021

Gallery

References

External links 
 Official website: Winners of New Talent Grand PIX
 55,000 admissions & PIX15 award winners

Film festivals in Denmark
Festivals in Copenhagen
Recurring events established in 2009
Film festivals established in 2008
Autumn events in Denmark